The 2021 Blue-Emu Maximum Pain Relief 500 was a NASCAR Cup Series race held on April 10 and 11th, 2021, at Martinsville Speedway in Ridgeway, Virginia. Contested over 500 laps on the  paperclip-shaped short track, it was the eighth race of the 2021 NASCAR Cup Series season.

Report

Background

Martinsville Speedway is an NASCAR-owned stock car racing track located in Henry County, in Ridgeway, Virginia, just to the south of Martinsville. At  in length, it is the shortest track in the NASCAR Cup Series. The track was also one of the first paved oval tracks in NASCAR, being built in 1947 by H. Clay Earles. It is also the only remaining race track that has been on the NASCAR circuit from its beginning in 1948.

Entry list
 (R) denotes rookie driver.
 (i) denotes driver who are ineligible for series driver points.

Qualifying
Joey Logano was awarded the pole for the race as determined by competition-based formula.

Starting Lineup

Race

Denny Hamlin was awarded the pole. The race was postponed from Saturday to Sunday due to rain. Hamlin dominated and won both stages. Kurt Busch got into the wall after contact with Erik Jones while Aric Almirola spun into the wall after contact with Matt DiBenedetto. Brad Keselowski got into the wall along with Daniel Suárez, whose car caught fire. Keselowski again got into the wall along with Jones and Ross Chastain. Chris Buescher got turned and caused a huge stack up that collected Keselowski, DiBenedetto, Ryan Preece, Anthony Alfredo, Alex Bowman, and others. Martin Truex Jr. would outduel the dominant Hamlin and hold off Chase Elliott for his second win of the season.

Stage Results

Stage One
Laps: 130

Stage Two
Laps: 130

Final Stage Results

Stage Three
Laps: 240

Race statistics
 Lead changes: 18 among 7 different drivers
 Cautions/Laps: 15 for 102
 Red flags: 2 for 18 hours, 42 minutes and 31 seconds
 Time of race: 3 hours, 54 minutes and 25 seconds
 Average speed:

Media

Television
Fox Sports covered their 21st race at the Martinsville Speedway. Mike Joy, nine-time Martinsville winner Jeff Gordon and 2018 Martinsville winner Clint Bowyer called the race from the broadcast booth. Jamie Little and Regan Smith handled pit road for the television side. Larry McReynolds provided insight from the Fox Sports studio in Charlotte.

Radio
MRN had the radio call for the race which was also simulcasted on Sirius XM NASCAR Radio. Alex Hayden and Jeff Striegle called the race in the booth as the cars raced down the frontstretch. Dave Moody called the race from atop the turn 3 stands as the field raced down the backstretch. Pit lane was manned by Steve Post and Kim Coon.

Standings after the race

Drivers' Championship standings

Manufacturers' Championship standings

Note: Only the first 16 positions are included for the driver standings.
. – Driver has clinched a position in the NASCAR Cup Series playoffs.

References

Blue-Emu Maximum Pain Relief 500
Blue-Emu Maximum Pain Relief 500
Blue-Emu Maximum Pain Relief 500
NASCAR races at Martinsville Speedway